The West Indies cricket team is touring Sri Lanka from 10 November to 21 December 2010. The tour consists of one three One Day Internationals (ODIs) and three Tests. A three-day tour match between West Indies and Sri Lanka Cricket president's XI was also played at the Sinhalese Sports Club Ground from 10 to 12 November.

When the 3rd match of the Test series was played at Pallekele in Kandy, Pallekele International Cricket Stadium became the 104th Test venue in the world. The stadium is also Sri Lanka's eight.

A five-match ODI series and a single Twenty20 match were originally scheduled to be played from 9–19 and 21 December respectively. Due to bad weather, the ODI series was changed to three matches in late January 2011 and the Twenty20 match cancelled.

British Eurosport bagged the rights to show the matches in the United Kingdom.

Squads

‡ Sri Lanka named a 16-man squad for the first two one-day internationals on 4 December 2010.

First-class matches

Tour match – Sri Lanka Cricket president's XI v West Indians

Test Series
Alan G. Hurst of Australia served as the match referee for the Test series.

1st Test

Shane Shillingford was reported for a suspected illegal bowling action during the Test. He had match figures of five for 202 in the Test. Shillingford was reported to the International Cricket Council (ICC) by the two on-field umpires, as well as TV umpire Asad Rauf and fourth umpire Tyron Wijewardene due to a straightening of the arm during his Doosra delivery.

2nd Test

The 2nd Test was held at the R. Premadasa stadium despite its undergoing extensive renovation. The Sri Lankan Cricket Board defended choosing Premadasa stadium saying that the decision to stage a game was to allow cricketers to acclimatise themselves to the ground ahead of the 2011 World Cup games.

Sri Lanka cricket selectors recalled Nuwan Kulasekara and uncapped Shaminda Eranga for the second Test and dropped fast bowlers Dammika Prasad and Thilan Thushara, who went wicketless in the Galle Test. Suranga Lakmal made his Test debut to become Sri Lanka's 114th Test player.

Day 1 only saw 37. 2 overs of cricket due to a damp outfield and gloomy conditions. Sri Lanka went to stumps at 84 for three with Kemar Roach taking the wickets of Sri Lankan openers, Tharanga Paranavitana (16) and Tillakaratne Dilshan (4). On Day 2 Kumar Sangakkara completed his 24th Test century with an unbeaten 135 to guide Sri Lanka to 294 for five, when rain forced again a premature end. On Day 3 despite Sangakkara's departure for 150 in the morning, Sri Lanka looked to step up the scoring and declared at 387 for 9 after the tail chipped in with some valuable runs. In reply West Indies closed the day on 165 for five wickets with hosts gaining some edge with late strikes. Darren Bravo top scored for the visitors with a classy 80 only to end his innings in the day's penultimate over. Rain prevented any play on Day 4. In the afternoon play of Day 5 Sri Lanka took the remaining five West Indies first-innings wickets in less than two hours. Rangana Herath topped Sri Lanka's bowling and finished on 3/76.  Sri Lanka made a solid start in the evening session and declared at 57 for one wicket. Later Kummar Sanggakara said that he made the surprise declaration to try to get the psychological advantage over the visitors. The ploy worked for Sri Lanka, as they put pressure on the West Indies top order with ten overs of testing bowling. At the close West Indies were 12 for 2.

3rd Test

On the opening day, Pallekele International Cricket Stadium became the 104th Test venue in the world and Sri Lanka's eight. Nuwan Kulasekara, who played the 2nd Test was left out of the Sri Lankan side due to a side strain. He was replaced by medium pacer Dilhara Fernando.

The start of the match was delayed by a wet outfield and heavy rains. Bursts of rain just after lunch and bad light in the evening contributed to shorten Day 1 which only saw 40 overs of play. Suranga Lakmal trapped Chris Gayle Leg Before Wicket (LBW) for a duck with the day's first delivery to begin Test cricket at the new venue in dramatic fashion. By dismissing Gayle, he became the third bowler to take a wicket with the first ball bowled in a test match at a new venue, joining Kapil Dev of India and Imran Khan of Pakistan.

At close of play, half-centuries from inform Darren Bravo and Devon Smith helped the West Indies to reach 134 for 2 on Day 1. Only 41 overs of play were possible on Day 2 due to rain. West Indies were 244 for 5 at the close of play with Brendan Nash on 62 and Carlton Baugh yet to score.  Rain prevented any play on Day 3 and only 20 overs were possible on Day 4. Rangana Herath struck three times in the morning of Day 4 to claim the wickets of Brendan Nash, Carlton Baugh and Darren Sammy. No play was possible on Day 5 due to rain. A draw was declared after the match was called off at 1:30 pm local time.

ODI series
Five matches were originally scheduled for 9, 11, 15, 17, 19 December 2010. The Twenty20 match was scheduled for 21 December.

1st ODI

2nd ODI

3rd ODI

Media coverage

Television
British Eurosport: UK
Ten Sports : Middle-East, Pakistan, India, Sri Lanka

References 

2010 in Sri Lankan cricket
2010 in West Indian cricket
International cricket competitions in 2010–11
Sri Lankan cricket seasons from 2000–01
2010-11